Aix-en-Issart is a commune in the Pas-de-Calais department in northern France. A place named in Ascio is mentioned as early as 800 AD while during the Middle Ages the place used to be called Rodenaken by Flemish speaking people.

Geography
A small village situated some 5 miles(7 km) east of Montreuil-sur-Mer, at the D149 and D129 crossroads, by the banks of the small river Bras de Bronne, a tributary of the Canche.

Population

See also
Communes of the Pas-de-Calais department

References

Communes of Pas-de-Calais